Rainbow Six may refer to:
Rainbow Six (novel), a 1998 novel by Tom Clancy
Tom Clancy's Rainbow Six, a video game franchise published by Ubisoft
Tom Clancy's Rainbow Six (video game), a tactical shooter video game
"Rainbow Six", a song from JPEGMafia's album Veteran